23 August (Romanian: Douăzeci și Trei August) is a commune in Constanța County, Northern Dobruja, Romania. The commune includes three villages:
 23 August (historical names: Tatlâgeac Mare, ; Domnița Elena) – named after the day of the 1944 royal coup d'état
 Dulcești (historical name: Tatlâgeac Mic, Turkish: Küçük-Tatlıcak)
 Moșneni (historical name: Pervelia, Turkish: Perveli)

Demographics
At the 2011 census, 23 August had 4,813 Romanians (91.36%), 20 Roma (0.38%), 20 Turks (0.38%), 408 Tatars (7.74%), 7 others (0.13%).

Natives
Sîdîyîk Ibrahim H. Mîrzî
Ștefan Orza

References

Communes in Constanța County
Localities in Northern Dobruja
Populated coastal places in Romania